The 2020 season was the Jacksonville Jaguars' 26th season in the National Football League, their eighth and final season under general manager David Caldwell and their fourth and final season under head coach Doug Marrone. With a Week 11 loss to the Pittsburgh Steelers, the Jaguars dropped to 1–9 resulting in their third consecutive losing season and their ninth in ten seasons. After a loss to the Cleveland Browns in Week 12, the Jaguars both failed to improve on their 6–10 record from the previous season and were eliminated from playoff contention for the third consecutive season. They surpassed their loss total from the previous season after an overtime loss to the Minnesota Vikings.

On November 29, 2020, the Jaguars fired general manager David Caldwell following a 1–10 start to the season.

The Jaguars had the worst record in the 2020 season, and thereby earned the first overall draft pick for the first time in franchise history after a Week 16 loss to the Chicago Bears coupled with a win by the New York Jets. Following their week 17 loss to the Indianapolis Colts, the Jaguars became the fourth team in NFL history (and the second since the 16-game expansion) to win their season opener but lose their remaining games; the only other teams that accomplished this were the 1936 Philadelphia Eagles, the 1969 Pittsburgh Steelers, and the 2001 Carolina Panthers. The 1–15 record was also the worst in franchise history.

On January 4, 2021, the Jaguars fired head coach Doug Marrone, who finished his tenure in Jacksonville with a  record.

Draft

Pre-draft trades
The Los Angeles Rams traded their 2019 third-round selection as well as their 2020 fifth-round selection to Jacksonville in exchange for defensive end Dante Fowler.
The Seahawks traded their 2020 sixth-round selection to Jacksonville in exchange for Jacksonville's 2019 seventh-round selection.
The Jaguars traded their fifth-round selection to Pittsburgh in exchange for quarterback Joshua Dobbs.
The Rams traded their first-round selection as well as their 2021 first and fourth-round selections to Jacksonville in exchange for cornerback Jalen Ramsey.
The Jaguars traded cornerback A. J. Bouye to Denver in exchange for a fourth-round pick.
The Jaguars traded quarterback Nick Foles to Chicago in exchange for a fourth-round pick.
The Jaguars traded defensive end Calais Campbell to Baltimore in exchange for a fifth-round selection.

Staff

Final roster

Preseason
The Jaguars' preseason schedule was announced on May 7, but was later cancelled due to the COVID-19 pandemic.

Regular season

Schedule
The Jaguars' 2020 schedule was announced on May 7.

Note: Intra-division opponents are in bold text.

Game summaries

Week 1: vs. Indianapolis Colts

Week 2: at Tennessee Titans

Week 3: vs. Miami Dolphins

Week 4: at Cincinnati Bengals

Week 5: at Houston Texans

Week 6: vs. Detroit Lions

Week 7: at Los Angeles Chargers

Week 9: vs. Houston Texans

Week 10: at Green Bay Packers

Week 11: vs. Pittsburgh Steelers

Week 12: vs. Cleveland Browns

Week 13: at Minnesota Vikings

Week 14: vs. Tennessee Titans

Week 15: at Baltimore Ravens

Week 16: vs. Chicago Bears

Week 17: at Indianapolis Colts

Standings

Division

Conference

References

External links

Jacksonville
Jacksonville Jaguars seasons
Jacksonville Jaguars